The 3rd South American Youth Championships in Athletics were held in Santiago, Chile from November 4–7, 1976.

Medal summary
Medal winners are published for boys and girls.
Complete results can be found on the "World Junior Athletics History" website.

Men

Women

Medal table (unofficial)

Participation (unofficial)
Detailed result lists can be found on the "World Junior Athletics History" website.  An unofficial count yields the number of about 168 athletes from about 6 countries:  

 (40)
 (37)
 (40)
 (27)
 Perú (21)
 (3)

References

External links
World Junior Athletics History

South American U18 Championships in Athletics
1976 in Chilean sport
South American U18 Championships
International athletics competitions hosted by Chile
November 1976 sports events in South America